Whassup? (also known as Wazzup) was a commercial campaign for Budweiser beer from 1999 to 2002. The first spot aired during Monday Night Football on December 20, 1999. The ad campaign ran in much of the world and became a pop culture catchphrase, comically slurring "what's up?".

Origins
The commercials were based on the short film True written and directed by Charles Stone III, featuring Stone and several of his childhood friends: Fred Thomas, Paul Williams, Terry Williams, Jimmy "Puerto Rock" Perez, and Kevin Lofton. The characters sat around talking on the phone and saying "whassup?" to one another in a comical way. The short was popular at a number of film festivals around the country was eventually sent by Steve Weinshel of C&C STORM films to creative director Vinny Warren and art director Chuck Taylor at the Chicago-based ad agency DDB, who took the idea to August Busch IV, vice president of Anheuser-Busch, who licensed the idea from C&C Storm films and signed Stone to direct Budweiser TV commercials based on the film. Scott Martin Brooks won the role of Dookie when Kevin Lofton declined to audition.

Accolades
Whassup? was awarded the Cannes Grand Prix award and the Grand Clio award, among others. The campaign was inducted into the CLIO Hall of Fame in May 2006.

Sequel
Eight years after it first aired, Stone rebooted the ad, with the same cast, as Wassup 2008. The two-minute short film was heavily critical of the presidency of George W. Bush and was a clear endorsement of the presidential campaign of Barack Obama. The 2008 video was nominated for the Favorite User Generated Video award at the 35th People's Choice Awards.

In popular culture

The film Scary Movie (2000) parodied the ad in one scene.

In 2001, the British music duo Shaft released a song and video titled "Wassuup!" under the name Da Muttz, referencing the Budweiser ad, set to a sample of "U Can't Touch This" by MC Hammer (which, in turn, sampled Rick James' "Super Freak"). It reached number 11 on the UK Singles Chart, and was also a hit on charts across Europe and in Australia.

In a 2001 episode of the BBC sitcom My Family (Trust Never Sleeps), in the scene where Ben (Robert Lindsay) is in an off-licence whilst on the way from Chiswick to Oxford, the guy behind the counter and a customer both say the line to each other when the customer enters the shop.

Professional wrestling tag team The Dudley Boyz incorporated part of the ad as one of their signature moves. D-Von would climb to the top rope while Bubba Ray held an opponent's legs apart, before they both stuck out their tongues and did the Whassup head shake. D-Von would then execute a diving headbutt to the crotch of the opponent.

The Simpsons episodes "The Bart Wants What It Wants" (2002) and "See Homer Run" (2005) both feature the character Milhouse using the expression in an attempt to be cool.

The Greg the Bunny episode "Father and Son Reunion" (2002) featured the character Gil trying to bond with his son Jimmy. Gil thinks all young people use the expression to be cool. They go out together along with Greg the Bunny and Gil shouts the expression at everyone they meet, much to the embarrassment of Jimmy.

In the 2003 Friends episode "The One With Phoebe's Rats", Ross enters Monica and Chandler's apartment saying "Whassup" trying to imitate the commercial, to which Chandler replies, "Seriously dude, three years ago!"

The Office episode "Pilot" has Michael Scott, Jim, and Dwight exchanging the expression with each other. Jim wryly tells the camera that Scott is still doing it constantly, seven years after the ad was popular. Michael references the ad series again in Peacock's extended version of the episode "Local Ad".

The Aqua Teen Hunger Force episode "Multiple Meat" (2010) had Frylock using the expression to Master Shake and when the latter does not react to it he asks "I'm sorry, is that out now?"

The ad is also parodied in four episodes of the web series The Annoying Orange. It has since become a staple running gag.

The band Falling in Reverse parodied the ad in the music video of the song "Good Girls, Bad Guys" (2011).

The phrase is used as a recurring joke in the 2012 film That's My Boy, starring Adam Sandler and Andy Samberg. There are also multiple occurrences of Budweiser product placement throughout the film. 

In the film Central Intelligence (2016), Bob Stone sends Calvin Joyner a video clip of the ad and asks, "remember those commercials?"

In the How I Met Your Mother episode "Trilogy Time", Barney Stinson uses the expression in supposed "dream" futures.

In the Letterkenny episode "The Election" (2016), Stewart parodies the ad with Reilly & Jonesy in a campaign video for Wayne. 

In Season 1, Episode 8 of Santa Clarita Diet, Drew Barrymore’s character says "Whassup?" to a “dead” undead character Loki, played by DeObia Oparei.

In the film Ant-Man and the Wasp (2018) Luis pulls up next to Scott and says it multiple times.

In June 2018, Burger King and Budweiser partnered to create a new Whassup? commercial.

In Season 3 episode 1 of The Pj's Thurgood and his friends say Wassup over the phone.
In episode 148 of "Being the Elite" titled, "Dead Friend 1", Socal Uncensored (SCU) parodied the ad but instead of "Whassup", they say SCU.

A new version of the Budweiser ad was aired during the COVID-19 pandemic, encouraging friends to check in with each other during lockdown.

The introduction to Slowthai and Skepta's horror themed music video for "Cancelled" (2021) parodies the ad but instead they say "Wagwan?".

References

Advertising campaigns
American advertising slogans
Anheuser-Busch advertising
Greeting words and phrases
Comedy catchphrases
American television commercials
2000s in American television
Running gags
1999 neologisms